Kentucky Route 3155 (KY 3155), also known as the William Thomason Byway, or known locally as the Leitchfield Bypass, is a  state route located entirely in central Grayson County in north-central Kentucky. Both of this road's termini are intersections with KY 259 on the north and south sides of Leitchfield as it is a partial beltway around the city.

Route description
KY 3155 starts on the south side of Leitchfield near the Twin Lakes Regional Medical Center. It intersects KY 1214, U.S. Route 62 (US 62), and then KY 920 on the northeast side of town. It ends on the north side of Leitchfield at the second junction with KY 259.

Major intersections

References

3155
Transportation in Grayson County, Kentucky
Beltways in the United States